Civil peyniri is a brined string cheese that originated in Turkey.Civil cheese is one of the most important traditional foods, which produced and consumed especially in Kars and Erzurum. Civil peyniri a Turkish cheese made of sheep's milk, cow milk, goat milk, or a combination.

See also
 Turkish cuisine
 Chechil

References

Sheep's-milk cheeses
Goat's-milk cheeses
Turkish cheeses